The administrative divisions of Serbia are regulated by the Government of Serbia Enactment of 29 January 1992, and by the Law on Territorial Organization adopted by the National Assembly of Serbia on 29 December 2007.

Serbia is divided into 29 districts by the government decree issued in 1992. The units of the territorial organization are: municipalities and cities and autonomous provinces, by the Law on Territorial Organization.

Regions

Autonomous provinces 
The Constitution of Serbia recognizes two autonomous provinces, Vojvodina in the north, and the disputed territory of Kosovo and Metohija in the south, while the remaining area of Central Serbia never had its own regional authority. Following the Kosovo War, NATO-led peacekeepers entered Kosovo and Metohija, after the adoption of UNSC Resolution 1244. In 2008, Kosovo declared independence. The government of Serbia did not recognise the declaration, considering it illegal and illegitimate. 

The province of Vojvodina has its own assembly and government. It enjoys autonomy on certain matters, such as infrastructure, science, education and culture.

The Autonomous Province of Kosovo and Metohija has been transferred to the administration of the United Nations Interim Administration Mission in Kosovo (UNMIK) since June 1999, following the Kosovo War. In February 2008, the Government of Kosovo unilaterally declared independence from Serbia, a move recognized by  countries (including most of the European Union and the United States) but not recognized by Serbia, Russia, China, India, Brazil, Argentina, Indonesia, and other 87 United Nations (UN) member states, including 5 EU member states.

Statistical regions 
The five statistical regions of Serbia are:

 Vojvodina
 Belgrade
 Šumadija and Western Serbia
 Southern and Eastern Serbia
 Kosovo and Metohija

Districts

Districts are the first level administrative divisions of the country, constituted of municipalities and cities. Districts are regional centers of state authority, but have no assemblies of their own; they present purely administrative divisions, and host various state institutions such as funds, office branches and courts. Districts are not defined by the Law on Territorial Organisation, but are organised under the Government's Enactment of 29 January 1992.

Serbia is divided into 29 districts (18 in Central Serbia, 7 in Vojvodina, 5 in Kosovo, while the city of Belgrade presents a district of its own).

Municipalities and cities

Municipalities
Serbia is divided into 145 municipalities and 29 cities, which form the basic units of local government. Each municipality has its own assembly (elected every four years in local elections), a municipal president, public service property and a budget. Municipalities usually have more than 10,000 inhabitants.

Municipalities comprise local communities, which mostly correspond to settlements (villages) in the rural areas (several small villages can comprise one local community, and large villages can contain several communities). Urban areas are also divided into local communities. Their roles include communication of elected municipal representatives with citizens, organization of citizen initiatives related with public service and communal issues. They are presided over by councils, elected in semi-formal elections, whose members are basically volunteers. The role of local communities is far more important in rural areas; due to proximity to municipal centers, many urban local communities are defunct.

Cities

Cities are another type of local self-government. Territories with the status of "city" usually have more than 100,000 inhabitants, but are otherwise very similar to municipalities. There are 27 cities, each having an assembly and budget of its own. Only cities have mayors, although the presidents of the municipalities are often referred to as "mayors" in everyday usage.

The city may or may not be divided into "city municipalities". Six cities, Belgrade, Novi Sad, Niš, Požarevac, Užice and Vranje comprise several municipalities, divided into urban and suburban areas. Competences of cities and their municipalities are divided. Of those, only Novi Sad did not undergo the full transformation, as the newly formed municipality of Petrovaradin exists only formally; thus, the City municipality of Novi Sad is largely equated to City of Novi Sad (and the single largest municipality in the country, with around 300,000 residents).

Subdivisions of Kosovo

Although the Serbian laws treat Kosovo as every other part of Serbia, and divide it into 5 districts, 28 municipalities and 1 city, the UNMIK administration adopted new territorial organisation of Kosovo in 2000. This move is not recognized by Serbia, but is recognized by the self-proclaimed Republic of Kosovo. According to the new subdivision, Kosovo is divided into 7 (new) districts and 37 municipalities (8 new municipalities were created: Mališevo, Elez Han, Gračanica, Junik, Klokot-Vrbovac, Mamuša, Parteš and Ranilug). The "Serb" districts function in the areas where Kosovo Serbs live, but are only recognized by Serbs, while the "UNMIK" districts, which function in all of Kosovo, are recognized only by Kosovo Albanians.

Historical regions
 List of regions of Serbia
 Early Modern
 Middle Ages

See also
 Districts of Serbia
 Municipalities and cities of Serbia
 Cities and towns in Serbia
 Cities, towns and villages in Vojvodina
 Populated places in Serbia

 ISO 3166-2:RS

References

Sources

 
Serbia
Serbia